In linguistics, code-switching or language alternation occurs when a speaker alternates between two or more languages, or language varieties, in the context of a single conversation or situation. Code-switching is different from plurilingualism in that plurilingualism refers to the ability of an individual to use multiple languages, while code-switching is the act of using multiple languages together. Multilinguals (speakers of more than one language) sometimes use elements of multiple languages when conversing with each other. Thus, code-switching is the use of more than one linguistic variety in a manner consistent with the syntax and phonology of each variety. Code-switching may happen between sentences, sentence fragments, words, or individual morphemes (in synthetic languages). However, some linguists consider the borrowing of words or morphemes from another language to be different from other types of code-switching. Likewise, code-switching can occur when there is a change in the environment one is speaking. Code-switching can happen in the context of speaking a different language or switching the verbiage to match that of the audience. There are many ways in which code-switching is employed, such as when a speaker is unable to express themselves adequately in a single language or to signal an attitude towards something. Several theories have been developed to explain the reasoning behind code-switching from sociological and linguistic perspectives.

Use 

The earliest known use of the term code-switching in print was by Lucy Shepard Freeland in her 1951 book, Language of the Sierra Miwok, referring to the indigenous people of California. In the 1940s and the 1950s, many scholars considered code-switching to be a substandard use of language. Since the 1980s, however, most scholars have come to regard it as a normal, natural product of bilingual and multilingual language use. The term "code-switching" is also used outside the field of linguistics. Some scholars of literature use the term to describe literary styles that include elements from more than one language, as in novels by Chinese-American, Anglo-Indian, or Latino writers. In popular usage, code-switching is sometimes used to refer to relatively stable informal mixtures of two languages, such as Spanglish, Taglish, or Hinglish. Both in popular usage and in sociolinguistic study, the name code-switching is sometimes used to refer to switching among dialects, styles or registers. This form of switching is practiced, for example, by speakers of African American Vernacular English as they move from less formal to more formal settings. Such shifts, when performed by public figures such as politicians, are sometimes criticized as signaling inauthenticity or insincerity.

As switching between languages is exceedingly common and takes many forms, we can recognize code-switching more often as sentence alternation. A sentence may begin in one language, and finish in another. Or phrases from both languages may succeed each other in apparently random order. Such behavior can be explained only by postulating a range of linguistic or social factors such as the following:

 Speakers cannot express themselves adequately in one language so they switch to another to work around the deficiency. This may trigger a speaker to continue in the other language for a while.
 Switching to a minority language is very common as a means of expressing solidarity with a social group. The language change signals to the listener that the speaker is from a certain background; if the listener responds with a similar switch, a degree of rapport is established.
 The switch between languages can signal the speaker's attitude towards the listener - friendly, irritated, distant, ironic, jocular and so on. Monolinguals can communicate these effects to some extent by varying the level of formality of their speech; bilinguals can do it by language switching.

Distinguishing features 
Code-switching is distinct from other language contact phenomena, such as borrowing, pidgins and creoles, and loan translation (calques). Borrowing affects the lexicon, the words that make up a language, while code-switching takes place in individual utterances. Speakers form and establish a pidgin language when two or more speakers who do not speak a common language form an intermediate, third language. Speakers also practice code-switching when they are each fluent in both languages. Code mixing is a thematically related term, but the usage of the terms code-switching and code-mixing varies. Some scholars use either term to denote the same practice, while others apply code-mixing to denote the formal linguistic properties of language-contact phenomena and code-switching to denote the actual, spoken usages by multilingual persons.

Code-switching and language transfer 
There is much debate in the field of linguistics regarding the distinction between code-switching and language transfer. According to Jeanine Treffers-Daller, "considering CS [code-switching] and [language] transfer as similar phenomena is helpful if one wants to create a theory that is as parsimonious as possible, and therefore it is worth attempting to aim for such a unified approach, unless there is compelling evidence that this is not possible."

Not all linguists agree on whether they should be considered similar phenomena. In some cases, linguists refer to the benefits and disadvantages of language transfer as two separate phenomena, i.e., language transference and language interference, respectively. In such views, these two kinds of language transfer, along with code-switching, comprise what is known as cross-linguistic influence.

Part of the debate may be solved by simply clarifying some key definitions. Evidently, linguists sometimes use different terminology to refer to the same phenomenon, which can make it confusing to distinguish between two phenomena from one another in investigative discourse. For instance, psycholinguists frequently make use of the term language switching in reference to the "controlled and willed switching" to another language. However, this term is hardly used by linguists working on natural code-switching.

Linguists adopted that code-switching involves switching between languages. But when a multilingual speaker fluent in the languages being alternated, can alleviate the contention behind this debate. This is so because language transfer does not require switching between language systems to be done by a multilingual speaker. As a result, this can account for transfer errors, when proficiency in one language is lower than proficiency in the other.

On the other hand, there are linguists that maintain "that CS and transfer are manifestations of the same phenomenon, i.e. the influence of one language on another, is an attractive null hypothesis that can be tested in experimental settings."

Rationale 
There are several reasons to switch codes in a single conversation:
 A particular topic: People generally switch codes during discourse about a particular topic when specific language is necessary or preferred; alternative speech may better convey relevant concepts. 
 Quoting someone: People will switch codes while quoting another person.
 Solidarity and gratitude: When expressing gratitude or solidarity, code-switching can occur inadvertently or with the intention of fostering a rapport.
 Clarification: A speaker may engage in code-switching when listeners have difficulty comprehending specific words or concepts initially, or when the speaker does not know or remember the appropriate words in one of the languages.
 Group identity: People may alter their language to express group identification. This can happen, for example, when introducing members of a particular group to others.
 To soften or strengthen command: While asking someone to do something, code-switching works to mark emphasis or provide inspiration.
 Lexical need: People often use technical or idiomatic speech from a foreign or non-primary language; code-switching occurs when translating such words or phrases could distort the precise meaning.
Unconscious effort: People may engage in code-switching without thinking about it. This can occur when one is frightened by a specific event or circumstances such as going on a thrilling ride at an amusement park. 
To fit in: Code-switching is a useful tool for people to talk and act more like those around them.
To get something: People code-switching to a dialect, language, or accent of the local people in the area may get better deals, prices, or treatments when purchasing an item or service.
To avoid effects of implicit bias: Black Americans sometimes opt to use White-sounding verbiage and speech patterns in certain situations where the power dynamic is imbalanced, such as job interviews with a White employer.
To say something in secret: Code-switching can be used when a person wants to relay a message to another person with the intention that no one else around them can understand if they converse in another language.

Types 
Scholars use different names for various types of code-switching.

Intersentential switching occurs outside the sentence or the clause level (i.e. at sentence or clause boundaries). It is sometimes called "extrasentential" switching. In Assyrian-English switching one could say, "Ani wideili. What happened?" ("Those, I did them. What happened?").
Intra-sentential switching occurs within a sentence or a clause. In Spanish-English switching one could say, "La onda is to fight y jambar." ("The latest fad is to fight and steal.")
Tag-switching is the switching of either a tag phrase or a word, or both, from one language to another, (common in intra-sentential switches). In Spanish-English switching one could say, "Él es de México y así los criaron a ellos, you know." ("He's from Mexico, and they raise them like that, you know.")
Intra-word switching occurs within a word itself, such as at a morpheme boundary. In Shona-English switching one could say, "But ma-day-s a-no a-ya ha-ndi-si ku-mu-on-a. ("But these days I don't see him much.") Here the English plural morpheme -s appears alongside the Shona prefix ma-, which also marks plurality.

Most code-switching studies primarily focus on intra-sentential switching, as it creates many hybrid grammar structures that require explanation. The other types involve utterances that simply follow the grammar of one language or the other. Intra-sentential switching can be alternational or insertional. In alternational code-switching, a new grammar emerges that is a combination of the grammars of the two languages involved. Insertional code-switching involves "the insertion of elements from one language into the morphosyntactic frame of the other."

A portmanteau sentence is a particular type of intrasentential code-switching. It is a hybrid involving structures from two different languages in one sentence in which an item in one language as a bridge between portions of the sentence in languages which have differing word order typologies. It is more of a "syntactic blend" than the kind of lexical blend one sees in portmanteau words such as smog.

Theories

Social theories

Code-switching relates to, and sometimes indexes social-group membership in bilingual and multilingual communities. Some sociolinguists describe the relationships between code-switching behaviours and class, ethnicity, and other social positions.
In addition, scholars in interactional linguistics and conversation analysis have studied code-switching as a means of structuring speech in interaction. Some discourse analysts, including conversation analyst Peter Auer, suggest that code-switching does not simply reflect social situations, but that it is a means to create social situations.

Markedness model

The Markedness model, developed by Carol Myers-Scotton, is one of the more complete theories of code-switching motivations. It posits that language users are rational and choose to speak a language that clearly marks their rights and obligations, relative to other speakers, in the conversation and its setting. When there is no clear, unmarked language choice, speakers practice code-switching to explore possible language choices. Many sociolinguists, however, object to the Markedness Model's postulation that language-choice is entirely rational.

Sequential analysis
Scholars of conversation analysis such as Peter Auer and Li Wei argue that the social motivation behind code-switching lies in the way code-switching is structured and managed in conversational interaction; in other words, the question of why code-switching occurs cannot be answered without first addressing the question of how it occurs. Using conversation analysis (CA), these scholars focus their attention on the sequential implications of code-switching. That is, whatever language a speaker chooses to use for a conversational turn, or part of a turn, impacts the subsequent choices of language by the speaker as well as the hearer. Rather than focusing on the social values inherent in the languages the speaker chooses ("brought-along meaning"), the analysis concentrates on the meaning that the act of code-switching itself creates ("brought-about meaning").

Communication accommodation theory
The communication accommodation theory (CAT), developed by Howard Giles, professor of communication at the University of California, Santa Barbara, seeks to explain the cognitive reasons for code-switching, and other changes in speech, as a person either emphasizes or minimizes the social differences between himself and the other person(s) in conversation. Giles posits that when speakers seek approval in a social situation they are likely to converge their speech with that of the other speaker. This can include, but is not limited to, the language of choice, accent, dialect, and para-linguistic features used in the conversation. In contrast to convergence, speakers might also engage in divergent speech, in which an individual person emphasizes the social distance between himself and other speakers by using speech with linguistic features characteristic of his own group.

Diglossia

In a diglossic situation, some topics are better suited to the use of one language over another. Joshua Fishman proposes a domain-specific code-switching model (later refined by Blom and Gumperz) wherein bilingual speakers choose which code to speak depending on where they are and what they are discussing. For example, a child who is a bilingual Spanish-English speaker might speak Spanish at home and English in class, but Spanish at recess.

Linguistic theories

In studying the syntactic and morphological patterns of language alternation, linguists have postulated specific grammatical rules and specific syntactic boundaries for where code-switching might occur.

Constraint-based model: Poplack (1980)

Shana Poplack's model of code-switching is an influential theory of the grammar of code-switching. In this model, code-switching is subject to two constraints. The free-morpheme constraint stipulates that code-switching cannot occur between a lexical stem and bound morphemes. Essentially, this constraint distinguishes code-switching from borrowing. Generally, borrowing occurs in the lexicon, while code-switching occurs at either the syntax level or the utterance-construction level. The equivalence constraint predicts that switches occur only at points where the surface structures of the languages coincide, or between sentence elements that are normally ordered in the same way by each individual grammar. For example, the sentence: "I like you porque eres simpático" ("I like you because you are nice") is allowed because it obeys the syntactic rules of both Spanish and English. Cases like the noun phrases the casa white and the blanca house are ruled out because the combinations are ungrammatical in at least one of the languages involved. Spanish noun phrases are made up of determiners, then nouns, then adjectives, while the adjectives come before the nouns in English noun phrases. The casa white is ruled out by the equivalence constraint because it does not obey the syntactic rules of English, and the blanca house is ruled out because it does not follow the syntactic rules of Spanish.

Critics cite weaknesses of Sankoff and Poplack's model. The free-morpheme and equivalence constraints are insufficiently restrictive, meaning there are numerous exceptions that occur. For example, the free morpheme constraint does not account for why switching is impossible between certain free morphemes. The sentence: "The students had visto la película italiana" ("The students had seen the Italian movie") does not occur in Spanish-English code-switching, yet the free-morpheme constraint would seem to posit that it can. The equivalence constraint would also rule out switches that occur commonly in languages, as when Hindi postpositional phrases are switched with English prepositional phrases like in the sentence: "John gave a book ek larakii ko" ("John gave a book to a girl"). The phrase ek larakii ko is literally translated as a girl to, making it ungrammatical in English, and yet this is a sentence that occurs in English-Hindi code-switching despite the requirements of the equivalence constraint. The Sankoff and Poplack model only identifies points at which switching is blocked, as opposed to explaining which constituents can be switched and why.

Matrix language-frame model

Carol Myers-Scotton's Matrix Language-Frame (MLF) model is the dominant model of insertional code-switching. The MLF model posits that there is a Matrix Language (ML) and an Embedded Language (EL). In this case, elements of the Embedded Language are inserted into the morphosyntactic frame of the Matrix Language. The hypotheses are as follows (Myers-Scotton 1993b: 7):

The Matrix Language Hypothesis states that those grammatical procedures in the central structure in the language production system which account for the surface structure of the Matrix Language + Embedded Language constituent (linguistics) are only Matrix Language–based procedures. Further, the hypothesis is intended to imply that frame-building precedes content morpheme insertion. A Matrix Language can be the first language of the speaker or the language in which the morphemes or words are more frequently used in speech, so the dominant language is the Matrix Language and the other is the Embedded Language. A Matrix Language island is a constituent composed entirely of Matrix Language morphemes.

According to the Blocking Hypothesis, in Matrix Language + Embedded Language constituents, a blocking filter blocks any Embedded Language content morpheme which is not congruent with the Matrix Language with respect to three levels of abstraction regarding subcategorization. "Congruence" is used in the sense that two entities, linguistic categories in this case, are congruent if they correspond in respect of relevant qualities.

The three levels of abstraction are:
 Even if the Embedded Language realizes a given grammatical category as a content morpheme, if it is realized as a system morpheme in the Matrix Language, the Matrix Language blocks the occurrence of the Embedded Language content morpheme. (A content morpheme is often called an "open-class" morpheme, because they belong to categories that are open to the invention of arbitrary new items. They can be made-up words like "smurf", "nuke", "byte", etc. and can be nouns, verbs, adjectives, and some prepositions. A system morpheme, e.g. function words and inflections, expresses the relation between content morphemes and does not assign or receive thematic roles.)
 The Matrix Language also blocks an Embedded Language content morpheme in these constituents if it is not congruent with a Matrix Language content morpheme counterpart in terms of theta role assignment. 
Congruence between Embedded Language content morphemes and Matrix Language content morphemes is realized in terms of their discourse or pragmatic functions.

Examples
Hindustani (Urdu or Hindi)/English

 Swahili/English

We see that example 1 is consistent with the Blocking Hypothesis and the system content morpheme criteria, so the prediction is that the Hindi or Urdu equivalents are also content morphemes. Sometimes non-congruence between counterparts in the Matrix Language and Embedded Language can be circumvented by accessing bare forms. "Cell" is a bare form and so the thematic role of "cell" is assigned by the verb -wek- 'put in/on'; this means that the verb is a content morpheme.

The Embedded Language Island Trigger Hypothesis states that when an Embedded Language morpheme appears which is not permitted under either the Matrix Language Hypothesis or Blocking Hypothesis, it triggers the inhibition of all Matrix Language accessing procedures and completes the current constituent as an Embedded Language island. Embedded Language islands consist only of Embedded Language morphemes and are well-formed by Embedded Language grammar, but they are inserted in the Matrix Language frame. Therefore, Embedded Language islands are under the constraint of Matrix Language grammar.

 Swahili/English

 Swahili/English

Example 1 is ungrammatical (indicated by the leading asterisk) because "your" is accessed, so the Embedded Language Island Trigger Hypothesis predicts that it must be followed by an English head (e.g., "your letter") as an Embedded Language island. The reason is that possessive adjectives are system morphemes. We see the same thing happen in example 2, which is therefore ungrammatical. However, the correct way to finish the sentence is not "for wewe", switching back to Swahili; rather, it should end with "for you", which would be an Embedded Language island.

The Embedded Language Implicational Hierarchy Hypothesis can be stated as two sub-hypotheses: 
 The farther a constituent is from the main arguments of the sentence, the freer it is to appear as an Embedded Language island. 
 The more formulaic in structure a constituent is, the more likely it is to appear as an Embedded Language island. Stated more strongly, choice of any part of an idiomatic expression will result in an Embedded Language island.

The Implication Hierarchy of Embedded Language Islands:
 Formulaic expressions and idioms (especially prepositional phrases expressing time and manner, but also as verb phrase complements)
 Other time and manner expressions
 Quantifier expressions
 Non-quantifier, non-time noun phrases as verb phrase complements
 Agent Noun phrases
 Theme role and case assigners, i.e. main finite verbs (with full inflections)

 Wolof/French

 Arabic/English

 Swahili/English

We see example 1 work because the French Embedded Language island Le matin de bonne heure, "early in the morning", is a time expression. (Also, it is repeated in Wolof in the second sentence.) In example 2, we see the quantifier a lot of is a predicted Embedded Language island. Here we see an objective complement of a finite verb begin with the quantifier.

Constraint-free approach
Jeff MacSwan has posited a constraint-free approach to analyzing code-switching. This approach views explicit reference to code-switching in grammatical analysis as tautological, and seeks to explain specific instances of grammaticality in terms of the unique contributions of the grammatical properties of the languages involved. MacSwan characterizes the approach with the refrain, "Nothing constrains code-switching apart from the requirements of the mixed grammars." The approach focuses on the repudiation of any rule or principle which explicitly refers to code-switching itself. This approach does not recognize or accept terms such as "matrix language", "embedded language", or "language frame", which are typical in constraint-based approaches such as the MLF Model.

Rather than posit constraints specific to language alternation, as in traditional work in the field, MacSwan advocates that mixed utterances be analyzed with a focus on the specific and unique linguistic contributions of each language found in a mixed utterance. Because these analyses draw on the full range of linguistic theory, and each data set presents its own unique challenges, a much broader understanding of linguistics is generally needed to understand and participate in this style of codeswitching research.

For example, Cantone and MacSwan (2009) analyzed word order differences for nouns and adjectives in Italian-German codeswitching using a typological theory of Cinque that had been independently proposed in the syntax literature; their account derives the word order facts of Italian-German codeswitching from underlying differences between the two languages, according to Cinque's theory.

Controversies
Much remains to be done before a more complete understanding of code-switching phenomena is achieved. Linguists continue to debate apparent counter-examples to proposed code-switching theories and constraints.

The Closed-class Constraint, developed by Aravind Joshi, posits that closed class items (pronouns, prepositions, conjunctions, etc.) cannot be switched. The Functional Head Constraint developed by Belazi et al. holds that code-switching cannot occur between a functional head (a complementizer, a determiner, an inflection, etc.) and its complement (sentence, noun-phrase, verb-phrase). These constraints, among others like the Matrix Language-Frame model, are controversial among linguists positing alternative theories, as they are seen to claim universality and make general predictions based upon specific presumptions about the nature of syntax.

Myers-Scotton and MacSwan debated the relative merits of their approaches in a series of exchanges published in 2005 in Bilingualism: Language and Cognition, issues 8(1) and 8(2).

Neuroscience

Bilingual advantage 
Compared to their monolingual peers, bilingual children seem to have some advantage in non-linguistic tasks related to executive and attentional control. For instance, they are able to identify relevant visual information and ignore irrelevant perceptual information better than monolingual children. Bilinguals employ these executive and attentional processes daily as they need to quickly be able to select the correct vocabulary and grammar in context.

Neuroanatomy 
Research has shown that the knowledge and use of more than one language alters both the anatomical and functional organization of the brain, which leads to different functional capabilities both in language and other areas. Certain regions of the bilingual brain have been repeatedly shown to differ from those of monolinguals in both size and neural activity.

One such study (Michelli et al., 2004) showed significant increase in grey matter density in the left inferior parietal cortex of bilinguals relative to monolinguals as a specific instance of experience-dependent brain plasticity. Another study (Coggins et al., 2004) showed an increase in the volume of the anterior midbody of the corpus callosum, which is involved in primary and somatosensory function, in bilinguals. The research suggests the increase is an accommodation for the increased phonemic capacity requirement of bilinguals.

Subcortical network 
By using case studies of bilingual patients with cerebral lesions, researchers theorized that language switching relies on the inhibition of the non-target language using the left basal ganglia alongside executive control processes with the anterior cingulate, prefrontal, and front cortices, or bilateral supramarginal gyri and Broca's area. The dorsolateral prefrontal cortex has also been shown as significant in controlling language switching and inhibiting the unused language through observations of uncontrollable language switching in patients with damage to this brain area. Increased activation is seen in dorsolateral prefrontal cortex during language switching, but not regularly.

Extended control process model 
It is postulated that the language not in use is "active" during another language's use and can be primed by a conversation. That priming is what makes it difficult to pinpoint changes in activation within any given network. Based on various studies, it is shown that the immediate spoken context affects the likelihood of a code-switch; "prior utterances can influence the activation of lexico-syntactic representations, making such representations more available for selection".

The extended control process model states the following:"Language control signals operate on a subcortical gate that acts as a constructor of utterance plans. The gate interacts with frontal regions to select a syntactic structure and binds roles in that structure to a specific lexical content. Plans are constructed in the planning layer of competition queuing CQ network. The competitive choice layer of this network allows serial order to emerge from the parallel activation of items in the plan." The model hypothesizes that single language use and code-switching use two different types of language control, which is competitive control and cooperative control, respectfully. In competitive language control, the "gate" will only allow constructions from a single language to enter the plan. On the other hand, there are two forms of cooperative control: coupled control ("the matrix language temporarily cedes control to other language to allow intended insertion or alternation before control is returned back") and open control ("entry into the utterance planning mechanism is determined by whichever items from either language are most active at some moment in time").

Brain response 
In a study published in 2001, event-related potentials (ERPs) were recorded from native English speakers as they randomly named digits in English or their L2. The results of the study showed that participants named digits slower after a language switch, regardless of the switch direction. Language switches from the L1 to L2 were characterized with an N320 ERP, indicating inhibition of unwanted lexicon, which may reflect a greater need to suppress an active L1 when using L2. However, code-switching during language comprehension, as opposed to production, did not result in an N320.

A 2002 study showed that language switches based on expected endings to sentences (from context) elicited a response consistent with code switches being treated like "unexpected events at the physical level than at the lexico-semantic level. The more proficient the bilingual in L2, the earlier the latency and the smaller the amplitude was this positivity to the code-switch."

Limitations 
The lack of controlled environments for test subjects and their cognitive capabilities regarding language use and fluency has long been a concern in multilingual experimentation. Researchers try to "offset" results that follow no trends by analyzing social and linguistic history of the populations they are testing, but a good method to standardize data patterns and variation based on individual idiolects has yet to be created and implemented.

Only a few studies have been done to measure brain activity during code switches, and so general trends cannot be expanded into larger theories without additional research.

Examples in conversation 
In this section, segments that are switched from the primary language of the conversation are shown in bold.

African-American English and standard English in the classroom 
Children growing up in African American communities, who natively speak African-American Vernacular English (AAVE), acquire a kind of bilingualism (or bidialectism) when entering mainstream American classrooms. Teachers and academic expectations they encounter require them to use standard, higher-prestige linguistic features for school assignments and classroom participation, often effectively leading these students to develop an ability to code-switch rapidly between nonstandard AAVE and standard English features. This can pose a processing obstacle for some students who have to navigate subtle grammatical differences between the two varieties of English when interpreting prompts and instructions (see, e.g., Terry, et al., 2010 on past tense copula was/were). Age is a significant factor in determining how many AAVE forms vs. more standard forms are produced by a given student with a significant downshift in classroom AAVE production occurring around the transition from preschool to kindergarten and first grade. Craig and Washington (2004) found a reduction in five out of six morpho-syntactic characteristics studied across the transition from pre-kindergarten to kindergarten including null copula, zero articles, zero past tense, zero plurals, and zero prepositions. The bidialectism developed by these children offers similar advantages to other kinds of bilingualism including increased executive function and advances in critical thinking. As an example of this code-switching in action, see the following transcript of Rachel Jeantel's testimony in the trial of George Zimmerman for the murder of Trayvon Martin below. This transcript was analyzed in Rickford and King (2016); the bolded elements represent places where initially a null copula (indicated by the symbol ∅) was used which was switched to an overt copula ('s) when asked for clarification by the court reporter:

Cantonese and English 
The following examples demonstrate two types of code-switching (intra-sentential and inter-sentential code-switching) by Cantonese-English bilingual children. The examples are taken from the Hong Kong Bilingual Child Language Corpus.

The first example illustrates intra-sentential code-switching, where the child Alicia (age 2;00;26) inserted the English noun apple into her Cantonese sentence:

The second example displays inter-sentential code-switching, where the child Kasen (age 2;05;05) switched to Cantonese amid an English dialogical context:

Research has found that Cantonese-English bilingual children's intra- and inter-sentential code-switching behaviour is shaped by different factors. The children's intra-sentential code-switching is influenced by parental input rather than developmental language dominance. On the other hand, the children's inter-sentential code-switching is affected by their developmental language dominance (besides pragmatic factors). In Hong Kong, intra-sentential code-switching is a common social practice among adults. Since families provide the first social environment, and interaction with parents is highly influential in socializing children's language use, parental input will have impact on children's intra-sentential code-switching. On the other hand, inter-sentential code-switching is not as common in Hong Kong. It has been proposed that, for Cantonese-English children, their inter-sentential code-switching is related to their readiness, competency, and preference of speaking the designated language of the dialogical context; hence, their inter-sentential code-switching can be affected by developmental language dominance. This finding implies that, in societies where intra-sentential (but not inter-sentential) code-switching is a common social practice, inter-sentential code-switching may serve as signs of a bilingual child's language-dominance status.

Filipino and English

Code-switching between English and Tagalog (Filipino), as well as English and other native languages, are very widespread in the Philippines. Known generally as Taglish, it has become the de facto lingua franca among the urbanized and/or educated middle class. It is largely considered the "normal acceptable conversation style of speaking and writing" in informal settings. It is so widespread that a non-native speaker can be identified easily because they predominantly use pure Tagalog, whereas a native speaker would switch freely with English.

According to the linguist Maria Lourdes S. Bautista, there are two contrasting types of code-switching in the Philippines: deficiency-driven and proficiency-driven. Deficiency-driven code-switching is when a person is not competent in one language and thus has to switch back to the language they are more familiar with. This is common among younger children, as in the example below given by Bautista:

Proficiency-driven code-switching, on the other hand, is when a person is fully competent in both languages being used and can switch between them easily. It is the main type of code-switching in the islands. The example below is given by Bautista, taken from an interview with the television journalist Jessica Soho:

Proficiency-driven code-switching is characterized by frequent switching of the Matrix Language (ML) between Tagalog and English, demonstrating the high proficiency of the speakers in both languages. There are also a wide range of strategies involved, including: the formation of bilingual verbs by the addition of prefixes, suffixes, and infixes (e.g. Nagsa-sweat ako = "I was sweating"); switching at the morphological, word, phrasal, or clausal levels; and the use of system morphemes (like enclitics, conjunctions, etc.) within long stretches of ML content; and even the inversion of the verb–subject–object word order of Tagalog into the subject-verb-object order of English.

According to Bautista, the reason for this type of code-switching is what she termed "communicative efficiency", wherein a speaker can "convey meaning using the most accurate, expressive, or succinct lexical items available to them." The linguist Rosalina Morales Goulet also enumerated several reasons for this type of code-switching. They are: "for precision, for transition, for comic effect, for atmosphere, to bridge or create social distance, for snob appeal, and for secrecy."

French and Tamil
This example of switching from French to Tamil comes from ethnographer Sonia Das's work with immigrants from Jaffna, Sri Lanka, to Quebec. , who moved from Sri Lanka to Quebec as a child and now identifies as Québécois, speaks to Das in French. When Selvamani's sister, Mala, laughs,  switches to Tamil to ask Mala why she is laughing. After this aside,  continues to speak in French.  also uses the word tsé ("you know", contraction of tu sais) and the expression je me  pas poigner ("I will not be caught"), which are not standard French but are typical of the working-class Montreal dialect Joual.

Hopi and Tewa
They are discussing the selection of a site for a new high school in the eastern Hopi Reservation. In their two-hour conversation, the  primarily speak Tewa; however, when  addresses the Hopi Reservation as a whole, he code-switches to Hopi. His speaking Hopi when talking of Hopi-related matters is a conversational norm in the Arizona Tewa speech community. Kroskrity reports that these Arizona Tewa men, who culturally identify themselves as Hopi and Tewa, use the different languages to linguistically construct and maintain their discrete ethnic identities.

Latin and Irish
Irish annals were written in Ireland between the 8th and 17th centuries by Christian monks and priests. These were fluent in both Irish and Latin and wrote the annals in both languages, often switching between them within a single sentence.

An example is given below, from the 9th-century Martyrology of Óengus:

Here, a spurious etymology of the prince Connadil's name is given.

According to the scholar Nike Stam, "Many switches consisted of inserted Latin fragments: short phrases or single words. Some of these Latin phrases appeared to be of a formulaic nature and seemed to have originated in the medieval catena tradition. They are often used to provide cross-references to other sources or to combine conflicting opinions on a text. These are phrases like ut in proverbio dicitur ["as is said in the proverb"] and ut ferunt peritii ["as experience bears out"]. Most of the language switches, however, consisted of what Muysken called alternation: longer fragments like clauses or long phrases. This type of code-switching has been linked to bilingualism in societies that are strongly diglossic, and thus suggests that the scribes compiling and writing the glosses preferred to use their two languages according to specific norms."

Spanish and English

Researcher Ana Celia Zentella offers this example from her work with Puerto Rican Spanish-English bilingual speakers in New York City. In this example,  and her younger sister, speak Spanish and English with  outside of their apartment building. Zentella explains that the children of the predominantly Puerto Rican neighbourhood speak both English and Spanish: "Within the children's network, English predominated, but code-switching from English to Spanish occurred once every three minutes, on average."

See also

Bibliography of code-switching
Code-switching in Hong Kong
Cultural assimilation
Hegemony
Heteroglossia
Linguistic interference
Llanito
Macaronic language
Metalinguistic awareness
Metaphorical code-switching
Mixed language
Raciolinguistics
Register (sociolinguistics)
Respectability politics 
Situational code-switching
Style shifting
Translanguaging

References

 
Language acquisition
Sociolinguistics
Language contact